This is a list of fellows of the Royal Society elected in 1715.

Fellows
 Jacques d'Allonville (1671–1732)
 George Cholmondeley, 2nd Earl of Cholmondeley (c. 1666–1733)
 Antonio Schinella Conti (1677–1749)
 Justus van Effen (? 1684–1735)
 Claude Joseph Geoffroy (1685–1752)
 John Godfey (fl. 1715)
 James Hamilton, 7th Earl of Abercorn (1686–1744)
 Thomas Hodges (fl. 1715–1720)
 Paul Jacob Marperger (1683–1767)
 Pierre Remond de Montmort (1678–1719)
 John Noore (fl. 1715–1734)
 Francis Pemberton (? 1679–1762)
 Friedrich Ruysch (1638–1731)
 Willem 's Gravesande (1688–1742)
 John Sherlock (d. 1719)
 Bruno Tozzi (1656–1743)
 Nicolo Troni (1685–1772)
 Michaele Bernado Valentini (1657–1729)
 Levinus Vincent (1658–1728)
 Francois Wicardel, Chevalier de Fleury (1715–1754)

References

1715
1715 in science
1715 in England